The following list includes notable people who were born in or have lived in Waukesha, Wisconsin.

Academics, authors, and journalists 

Tim Cahill, adventure travel writer
Gordon Keith Chalmers, scholar
John Thomas Curtis, ecologist
David J. Eicher, editor and author
Margo Huston, reporter who won the 1977 Pulitzer Prize for Breaking News Reporting
Mary Schendlinger, writer and editor
Robert R. Spitzer, agricultural researcher
Michelle Thaller, astrophysicist
Sidney Dean Townley, astronomer and geodeticist
Vernor Vinge, science fiction author
Ray Wendland, petrochemist
Viola S. Wendt, poet

Artists and performers 

 Brad Beyer, actor
 Frank Caliendo, comedian
 Carmen De La Paz, television personality
 Danny Gokey, American Idol contestant
 Sue Hawk, reality television personality
 Drew Kunz, artist and poet
 Johnny Lechner, actor
 Sam Llanas, musician
 Mark Mallman, musician
 Les Paul, guitarist and inventor
 Rose Polenzani, folk musician
 Michael Ritchie, film director
 Heidi Stober, opera singer
 Nick Viall, reality television personality
 Hayward Williams, musician

Athletes

American Football 

 John Anderson, NFL player for the Green Bay Packers
 Erik Bickerstaff, NFL player for the Dallas Cowboys and Oakland Raiders
 Dick Blanchard, NFL player for the New England Patriots
 Max Broadhurst, NFL player for the Dayton Triangles
 Chuck DeShane, NFL player for the Detroit Lions
 Terry Dillon, NFL player for the Minnesota Vikings and Oakland Raiders
 John Golemgeske, NFL player for the Brooklyn Dodgers
 Pat Harder, NFL player for the Detroit Lions and Arizona Cardinals
 Frank Harris, NFL player for the Chicago Bears
 Frank Hertz, NFL player for the Milwaukee Badgers
 Matt Katula, NFL player for the Pittsburgh Steelers
 Ken Keuper, NFL player for the Green Bay Packers and New York Giants
 Kurt Larson, NFL player for the Indianapolis Colts and Green Bay Packers
 Bill Miklich, NFL player for the New York Giants and Detroit Lions
 Joe Schobert, NFL player for the Jacksonville Jaguars and Pittsburgh Steelers
 Bill Stetz, NFL player for the Philadelphia Eagles
 Derek Watt, NFL player for the Pittsburgh Steelers
 J. J. Watt, NFL player for the Houston Texans and Arizona Cardinals
 T. J. Watt, NFL player for the Pittsburgh Steelers
 Kevin Zeitler, NFL player for the Baltimore Ravens

Baseball 
Jack Kading, MLB player for the Pittsburgh Pirates
Jarred Kelenic, MLB player for the Seattle Mariners
Jim Pruett, MLB player for the Philadelphia Athletics

Other 

Austin Aries, professional wrestler
Mike Cahill, tennis player
Paul Hamm, Olympic gymnastic gold medalist
Morgan Hamm, Olympic gymnastic contender
Kirstin Holum, speed ice skater
Mary Beth Iagorashvili, Olympic pentathlete
Gwen Jorgensen, 2014 World Triathlon Series Champion
Ulvis Katlaps, ice hockey player
Lauri Merten, professional golfer and winner of the 1993 U.S. Women's Open
Nick Moon, soccer player
Melissa Mueller, Olympic pole vaulter
Elli Ochowicz, Olympic Speed Skater
Leslie Osborne, U.S. women's national soccer team
Erik Sowinski, middle-distance runner
Lester Stevens, Olympic athlete
Tim Ward, soccer player for the Chicago Fire of Major League Soccer
Mitchell Whitmore, Olympic speedskater

Businesspeople 
Donald Goerke, inventor of SpaghettiOs
Richard W. Sears, founder of Sears and Roebuck

Military personnel 
Miriam Ben-Shalom, activist and former staff sergeant
Joseph E. Carberry, aviator
Alfred Gorham, Tuskegee Airman
John Patten Story, U.S. Army major general

Politicians and government officials

Wisconsin State Legislators 

Roderick Ainsworth, Wisconsin State Representative
Scott Allen, Wisconsin State Representative
Winchel Bacon, Wisconsin State Representative
Silas Barber, Wisconsin State Representative
William Blair, Wisconsin State Senator
John F. Buckley, Wisconsin legislator and lawyer
Phineas Clawson, Wisconsin State Senator
Dave Craig, Wisconsin State Representative and Senator
David L. Dancey, Wisconsin State Legislator and jurist
J. Mac Davis, jurist and Wisconsin State Senator
Elihu Enos, educator and Wisconsin state legislator
William A. Freehoff, Wisconsin State Senator
Joseph J. Hadfield, Wisconsin state legislator
Joanne Huelsman, Wisconsin State Representative and Senator
Edward Jackamonis, speaker of the Wisconsin State Assembly
Scott Jensen, speaker of the Wisconsin State Assembly
Alfred M. Jones, Illinois State Representative and Wisconsin State Senator
Edwin B. Kelsey, Wisconsin State Representative
Joel Kleefisch, Wisconsin State Representative
Bill Kramer, Wisconsin State Representative
William Langer, Wisconsin State Representative
Vincent R. Mathews, Wisconsin State Representative
Ernst Merton, Wisconsin State Senator and lawyer
Roger P. Murphy, Wisconsin State Senator and jurist
Scott Newcomer, Wisconsin State Representative
Alexander Randall, Wisconsin governor
Jon Richards, Wisconsin State Representative and circuit court judge
John C. Schober, Wisconsin State Representative and lawyer
Ellicott R. Stillman, Wisconsin State Representative
Daniel H. Sumner, Wisconsin State Representative
Vernon Tichenor, Wisconsin State Representative
Henry Totten, Wisconsin State Representative and businessman
Joseph Turner, Wisconsin Territorial and State Senator
Daniel P. Vrakas, Wisconsin State Representative
John M. Wells, Wisconsin State Representative
E. B. West, Wisconsin State Senator
John W. Whelan, Wisconsin State Representative and Senator
George Winans, Wisconsin State Representative

Other 

 William A. Barstow, Governor of Wisconsin, Union Army general
 William G. Callow, Wisconsin Supreme Court
 Eugene W. Chafin, Prohibition Party Presidential candidate
 Glenn R. Davis, U.S. Representative
 Lee S. Dreyfus, Governor of Wisconsin
 Daniel Hoan, Mayor of Milwaukee
 Edmund C. Moy, businessman and U.S. Mint director
 Edwin M. Randall, Chief Justice of the Florida Supreme Court
 Paul F. Reilly, Judge of the Wisconsin Court of Appeals
 Eleazer Root, Episcopal priest and local politician
 Donald E. Tewes, U.S. Representative
 Tom Tillberry, Minnesota State Representative
 Robert William Wright, lawyer and politician

Other 

 Little Lord Fauntleroy, unidentified homicide victim found in 1921
 Deb Hoffmann, collector
 Florence E. Kollock (1848–1925), Universalist minister and lecturer

See also 
Waukesha, Wisconsin
List of people from Wisconsin

References 

Waukesha
Waukesha